Lee Kalcheim (June 27, 1938 in Philadelphia, Pennsylvania) is an American screenwriter.

Television
Kalcheim has written numerous television shows including episodes for The Paper Chase (1985); All in the Family (1971–72; Emmy 1973); N.Y.P.D. (1967–69); The Alfred Hitchcock Hour (1965); and the ABC After School Special: "The Bridge of Adam Rush" (1974). He was also a creator for the sitcom Something Wilder, which was originally inspired by his own experiences as a father.

Filmography

Plays

References

External links

http://LeeKalcheim.com

American male screenwriters
Emmy Award winners
Living people
1938 births